Zadadra is a genus of moths in the subfamily Arctiinae.

Most species were previously placed in the genus Eilema.

Species
 Zadadra costalis (Moore, 1878)
 Zadadra distorta (Moore, 1872)
 Zadadra fuscistriga (Hampson, 1894)

References

Lithosiina
Moth genera